Kelis Was Here is the fourth studio album by American singer Kelis, released on August 22, 2006, by Jive Records. Originally titled The Puppeteer, the album features production by Bangladesh, Raphael Saadiq, Max Martin, Sean Garrett, and Scott Storch, among others, and also features collaborations with will.i.am, Nas, Cee-Lo, Too Short, and Spragga Benz. It is Kelis's first album not to feature longtime collaborators the Neptunes. Kelis Was Here received a nomination for Best Contemporary R&B Album at the 2007 Grammy Awards.

Release and promotion
The album's lead single, "Bossy", features rapper Too Short. The song peaked at number 16 on the Billboard Hot 100 and was certified double platinum by the Recording Industry Association of America (RIAA) on December 11, 2006. The second single from the album, "Blindfold Me", featuring Nas, was released solely in the United States. It failed to enter the Billboard Hot 100, while peaking at number 91 on the Hot R&B/Hip-Hop Songs chart. "Lil Star", which features Cee-Lo of the duo Gnarls Barkley, was released internationally as the album's third and final single. The track reached number three on the UK Singles Chart, earning Kelis her fifth UK top-five single as a lead artist.

Due to the use of "I Don't Think So" in a promotional advertising for Big Brother Australia 2008, the song entered the Australian ARIA Singles Chart at number 49 on April 21, 2008. The following week it rose to number 29, ultimately peaking at number 27. It also reached number eight on the ARIA Urban Singles Chart.

Critical reception

Kelis Was Here received generally positive reviews from music critics. At Metacritic, which assigns a normalized rating out of 100 to reviews from mainstream publications, the album received an average score of 70, based on 23 reviews. Ann Powers from the Los Angeles Times praised its eclectic music and said that it "mines a memory of R&B as the playground of category-dismantling individualists." NME magazine wrote that it feels like "a wildly ambitious Warhol-esque art project." Kelefa Sanneh from The New York Times described the album as "typically garish and glorious", with sounds that range from "space-age hip-hop ... to space-age guitar pop". Q magazine said that the album is "chock-full of surreal soul diamonds." Pitchforks Tim Finney wrote that, like Wanderland, the album is "formally varied but feels consistent—even monochrome in parts." In a review for The Observer, Peter Robinson commented that the album "occasionally misfires ... but there's still sass and creativity here." MSN Music's Robert Christgau gave Kelis Was Here a one-star honorable mention, indicating "a worthy effort consumers attuned to its overriding aesthetic or individual vision may well like." He cited "Blindfold Me" and "What's That Right There" as highlights, and quipped, "Good for sex and not much else, which in a fantasy object is plenty."

In a mixed review, Slant Magazine critic Preston Jones said that, although it is "an intriguing mishmash of sounds, beats, and vocal affectations", the album is "far too long" and lacks a song on-par with "Milkshake". Chris Salmon of The Guardian wrote that without the Neptunes, "contributors such as Black Eyed Peas' Will.i.am and [...] Shondrae reject all subtlety for songs that caricature Kelis as sexy, bolshy and not much else. The results are shallow and unconvincing, driven by the kind of brash holler and breathy schmaltz you would expect from J-Lo or Pussycat Dolls (complete with the rubbish guest raps)." Mikael Wood of Spin said that Kelis "consolidates" her previous "allure" and "turns up sex, turns down sass". Andy Kellman of AllMusic felt that it lacks first-rate material and "the range of emotions to match the varied backdrops." Quentin B. Huff of PopMatters argued that "[t]he songs are individually good, but don't really sound like they should have been grouped together on an album."

The album was nominated for Best Contemporary R&B Album at the 2007 Grammy Awards, but lost out to Beyoncé's B'Day.

Commercial performance
Kelis Was Here debuted at number 10 on the Billboard 200 with 58,000 copies sold in its first week, becoming Kelis's highest-peaking album on the chart to date. According to Nielsen SoundScan, the album had sold 160,000 copies in the United States as of May 2010.

The album debuted at number 41 on the UK Albums Chart, selling 6,709 copies in its first week. It was certified silver by the British Phonographic Industry (BPI) on September 29, 2006, and by May 2010, it had sold 32,083 copies in the United Kingdom.

Track listing

Notes
  signifies a co-producer

Sample credits
 "What's That Right There" contains a sample from "(Not Just) Knee Deep", as performed by Funkadelic.

Personnel
Credits adapted from the liner notes of Kelis Was Here.

Musicians

 Kelis – vocals
 Too Short – vocals 
 will.i.am – drum programming ; clavinet, Moog bass ; synth, drums ; vocals, keyboards 
 Keith Harris – keyboards ; Rhodes guitar ; additional keyboards, Moog bass 
 Printz Board – trumpet 
 George Pajon Jr. – guitar 
 Chuck Prada – percussion 
 Raphael Saadiq – bass, guitar 
 Bobby Ozuna – drums, turntables ; percussion 
 Charles Jones – piano, keyboards 
 Meneradini "Bridge" Timothee – piano, keyboards 
 Cheryl Evans – background vocals 
 Smoke – vocals 
 Cee-Lo Green – vocals 
 Lukasz Gottwald – all instruments 
 Max Martin – all instruments 
 Teddy "Bear" – programming, keyboards 
 Joseph Edwards – choir 
 Sandra Riley – choir 
 Erika Schimdt – choir 
 Julio Hanson – choir 
 Jim Gilstrap – choir 
 Kerry Paxton – choir 
 Dawn Beckman – choir 
 John Patrick – choir 
 Jason Brown – choir 
 Renee Bowers – choir 
 Damon Elliott – arrangement 
 Grecco Burratto – co-arrangement 
 Renato Brasa – percussion

Technical

 Bangladesh – production ; recording 
 Sean Garrett – co-production ; production 
 Doug Wilson – recording 
 Charles McCrorey – recording 
 Too Short – recording 
 John Frye – mixing 
 will.i.am – production 
 Padraic Kerin – recording 
 Joe Peluso – engineering assistance ; mix engineering assistance 
 Ethan Willoughby – mixing 
 Raphael Saadiq – production 
 Jake and the Phatman – co-production 
 Danny Romero – recording, mixing 
 John Tanksley – Pro Tools engineering 
 James Tanksley – Pro Tools engineering assistance 
 Wesley Morrow – production coordination 
 Polow da Don – production 
 Brian Sumner – recording 
 Brian Stanley – mixing 
 Mike Makowski – mixing assistance 
 Cool & Dre – production 
 Robert "Brizz" Brisbane – recording 
 Phil Tan – mixing 
 Josh Houghkirk – mixing assistance 
 Scott Storch – production 
 Jason "Poo Bear" Boyd – co-production 
 Conrad Golding – recording 
 Marc Lee – recording 
 Wayne "The Brain" Allison – recording 
 Vadim Chislov – recording assistance 
 James Roach – recording assistance 
 Fabian Marasciullo – mixing 
 Chad Jolley – mixing assistance 
 Knobody – production 
 Tatsuya Sato – recording 
 Kevin Crouse – recording 
 Neal Pogue – mixing 
 Jean-Marie Horvat – mixing 
 Colin Miller – mixing assistance 
 Cee-Lo Green – production 
 Ben H. Allen – recording 
 Serban Ghenea – mixing 
 John Hanes – Pro Tools engineering ; additional Pro Tools engineering 
 Tim Roberts – Pro Tools engineering assistance 
 Max Martin – production 
 Dr. Luke – production 
 Darien Gap – mixing 
 Damon Elliott – production 
 Teddy "Bear" – co-production 
 Renson Mateo – recording 
 Nathan Connelly – recording assistance 
 Dave "Hard Drive" Pensado – mixing 
 The Blitzburg Group – mixing assistance 
 Dave Mattix – recording assistance 
 Chris Athens – mastering
 Kelis – executive production
 Mark Pitts – executive production
 J. Erving – executive production

Artwork
 Denise Trotman – art direction, design
 Markus Klinko – photography
 Indrani – photography

Charts

Certifications

Release history

Notes

References

2006 albums
Albums produced by Bangladesh (record producer)
Albums produced by Bloodshy & Avant
Albums produced by Cool & Dre
Albums produced by Dr. Luke
Albums produced by Max Martin
Albums produced by Polow da Don
Albums produced by Raphael Saadiq
Albums produced by Scott Storch
Albums produced by Sean Garrett
Albums produced by will.i.am
Albums recorded at Westlake Recording Studios
Jive Records albums
Kelis albums
Virgin Records albums